Breen Township is a civil township of Dickinson County in the U.S. state of Michigan.  As of the 2010 census, the township population was 499, slightly up from 479 at the 2000 census.

Communities
There are no incorporated municipalities in the township. 
It was a station on a branch of the Chicago and North Western Railway. The community was founded and named after Alonzo L. Foster, a lumberman. A post office was established in 1886 and continues to be served by ZIP Code 49834.
It was a station on the Chicago and North Western Railway, named by its principal proprietors, the Menominee Hardwood & Shingle Company in 1884. A post office was in operation for several months in 1891. It is currently served by ZIP Code 49834 out of Foster City, Michigan .
Hylas is a historic locale, located about three miles east of Hardwood on M-69. It was a station on the Chicago and North Western Railway, named by the railroad for Hylas from Greek mythology.

Geography

Demographics
As of the census of 2000, there were 479 people, 201 households, and 144 families residing in the township.  The population density was 5.5 per square mile (2.1/km2).  There were 431 housing units at an average density of 4.9 per square mile (1.9/km2).  The racial makeup of the township was 97.49% White, 0.42% Asian, and 2.09% from two or more races. 27.8% were of Swedish, 18.2% French, 15.4% German, 6.3% French Canadian and 5.8% Belgian ancestry according to Census 2000.

There were 201 households, out of which 25.9% had children under the age of 18 living with them, 63.2% were married couples living together, 5.0% had a female householder with no husband present, and 27.9% were non-families. 26.4% of all households were made up of individuals, and 13.9% had someone living alone who was 65 years of age or older.  The average household size was 2.38 and the average family size was 2.86.

In the township the population was spread out, with 21.7% under the age of 18, 6.3% from 18 to 24, 22.8% from 25 to 44, 30.5% from 45 to 64, and 18.8% who were 65 years of age or older.  The median age was 44 years. For every 100 females, there were 103.8 males.  For every 100 females age 18 and over, there were 100.5 males.

The median income for a household in the township was $30,313, and the median income for a family was $37,969. Males had a median income of $36,250 versus $28,333 for females. The per capita income for the township was $14,497.  About 12.8% of families and 13.5% of the population were below the poverty line, including 23.9% of those under age 18 and 9.3% of those age 65 or over.

References 

Townships in Dickinson County, Michigan
Iron Mountain micropolitan area
Townships in Michigan